Sven Rüno (April 13, 1901 – October 7, 1960) was a Swedish composer of film scores.  He scored a number of the Åsa-Nisse comedy series. He also composed the 1938 Christmas song "Jul i främmande hamn".

Selected filmography
 Beredskapspojkar (1940)
 Everybody at His Station (1940)
 Fransson the Terrible (1941)
 Doctor Glas (1942)
 Mister Collins' Adventure (1943)
 She Thought It Was Him (1943)
 The Bride Came Through the Ceiling (1947)
 Perhaps a Gentleman (1950)
Åsa-Nisse Goes Hunting (1950)
 Livat på luckan (1951)
 Åsa-Nisse på nya äventyr (1952)
 Åsa-Nisse on Holiday (1953)
 Åsa-Nisse ordnar allt (1955)
 Bröderna Östermans bravader (1955)
 Åsa-Nisse in Military Uniform (1958)

References

Bibliography
 Rasmussen, Bjørn. Filmens hvem-vad-hvor: Udenlanske film 1950-1967. Politiken, 1968.

External links

1901 births
1960 deaths
Swedish composers
People from Stockholm